Tomás Mac an tSaoir (born 1990 in County Kerry) is an Irish sportsperson. He plays Gaelic football with An Rinn having transferred from his local club An Ghaeltacht in 2022 and is a former member of the senior Kerry county football team. He made his Kerry under-21 debut on 15 March 2008 against Limerick. That year the Kerry U21s won the All-Ireland Under 21 Football Championship. In March 2010, he was nominated captain of the Kerry under-21 team. As of 2017, he was playing as goalkeeper for the Kerry junior county team.

In 2021, he joined newly appointed Waterford football manager Shane Ronayne's backroom team as goalkeeping coach.

References

1990 births
21st-century Irish people
Living people
An Ghaeltacht Gaelic footballers
Gaelic football goalkeepers
Gaelic football goalkeeping coaches
Kerry inter-county Gaelic footballers